Poison Dust is a 2005 American documentary film starring Ramsey Clark, Juan Gonzalez, Rosalie Bertell, Helen Caldicott, Michio Kaku and directed by Sue Harris.

Overview
The film is a documentary about U.S. soldiers returning from Iraq who had been exposed to radioactive dust from dirty bombs when artillery shells coated with depleted uranium or DU are fired.  Many suffer mysterious illnesses and have children with birth defects.

References

External links
 

2005 documentary films
2005 films
American documentary films
Documentary films about the Iraq War
Documentary films about veterans
Radiation health effects
Documentary films about environmental issues
Documentary films about nuclear technology
2000s English-language films
2000s American films